The 2015–16 Liga Nacional de Básquet season was the 32nd season of the top professional basketball league in Argentina. The regular season started on 22 September 2015 and the defending champions were Club Atlético Quimsa. The finals were contested between San Lorenzo and La Unión, with San Lorenzo winning their first league title on 23 June 2016.

Promotions and relegations
Torneo Nacional de Ascenso Champions from the previous season Instituto de Córdoba and runners-up 9 de Julio de Río Tercero were promoted. The latter, however, merged with newly reformed San Lorenzo, one of the founding teams of the original League, marking this their official return to the top tier. Another team that made its return was Ferro Carril Oeste, one of the powerhouses of the 80s and the inaugural Champion. The club purchased their league spot from Ciclista Juninense, whose financial situation made it impossible for them to keep competing at the top level, and returned to the Torneo Nacional de Ascenso. At the end of the season, Juventud Sionista was relegated after losing the playoff series against Lanús.

Clubs

Regular season

League table

North Conference

South Conference

Playoffs

Championship playoffs

Relegation playoffs

Clubs in international competitions

Awards

Yearly Awards
Most Valuable Player: Justin Williams, Ciclista Olímpico
Best Foreign Player:  Justin Williams, Ciclista Olímpico
Sixth Man of the Year: Mauro Cosolito, Ciclista Olímpico
Rookie of the Year: Pablo Bertone, Lanús
Coach of the Year: Fernando Duró, Ciclista Olímpico
Most Improved Player: Lucio Redivo, Bahía Basket
All-Tournament Team:
 F Federico Aguerre, Gimnasia Indalo
 F Walter Herrmann, San Lorenzo
 C Justin Williams, Ciclista Olímpico
 G Maximiliano Stanic, Ciclista Olímpico
 G Walter Baxley, Quilmes

References

Liga Nacional de Básquet seasons
   
Argentina